The 2014 FAM Youth Championship, known as the eLL Mobile FAM Youth Championship for sponsorship reasons, is the 4th season of the FAM Youth Championship, which includes the youth teams of all the 2014 Dhivehi League teams and 5 other teams from any part of the Maldives who want to participate (Vaikaradhoo Football Club, Veyru Cports Club, Kelaa Naalhi Sports, Eydhafushi Zuvaanunge Club and Club Green Street). The age group of this tournament is Under-21. This tournament is supported by the Japan Football Association.

Participated Teams
It was planned to participate 12 teams in the competition  but, the Football Association of Maldives decided to give permission for all the 14 teams who wants to participate, in order to create more young stars. Later, out of the 14 teams, Vilimale' United withdrew from the competition due to an unknown reason.

Group 1
 Club Valencia
 Club Eagles
 Mahibadhoo Sports Club
 Victory Sports Club
 Club Green Street

Group 2
 New Radiant Sports Club
 Maziya Sports & Recreation Club
 Vaikaradhoo Football Club
 Veyru Sports Club

Group 3
 B.G. Sports Club
 Kelaa Naalhi Sports
 Club All Youth Linkage
 Eydhafushi Zuvaanunge Club

Personnel

Venue
All the matches of this edition of Youth Championship is decided to be played at the FAM No: 1 Turf ground due to the renovation work going on in the Galolhu National Stadium for the 2014 AFC Challenge Cup.

Group stage
''Times are Indian Ocean, Maldives (UTC+5).

Group 1

Group 2

Group 3

Third placed teams

Quarter-finals

Semi-finals

Final

Season statistics

Goal scorers
4 goals
 (Eagles) Ahmed Rizuvan

3 goals
 (Eagles) Ansar Ibrahim

1 goal
 (Eagles) Ahmed Naufal
 (Eagles) Ibrahim Mubeen Ahmed Rasheed
 (Eagles) Mohamed Muslih
 (Mahibadhoo) Gasim Samaam

Hat-tricks

4 Player scored 4 goals

Clean sheets

Player

Club
 Most clean sheets: 1
 Eagles
 Mahibadhoo
 Fewest clean sheets: 1
 Valencia
 Victory

Discipline

Player
Most yellow cards: 1
Riham Abdul Ganee (Eagles)
Hussain Afsal (Victory)
Most red cards: 0

Club

Most yellow cards: 1
Eagles
Victory
Most red cards: 0

Awards

Notes

References

External links
 FAM Youth Championship at Facebook
 FAM Youth Championship at Haveeru Online (Dhivehi)

FAM Youth Championship
4